William Duckworth may refer to:

 Will Duckworth (1954), deputy leader of the Green Party of England and Wales
 William Duckworth (football manager) (fl. 1934–1946), Scottish professional football coach active in France
 William Duckworth (composer) (1943–2012), American composer
 William Duckworth (Canadian politician) (1884–1951), Ontario merchant and political figure
 William Duckworth (British politician) (1879–1952), British Member of Parliament for Manchester Moss Side, 1935–1945
 William Henry Duckworth (1894–1969), justice of the Supreme Court of Georgia

See also
 Billy Duckworth (born 1959), Australian rules footballer 
 Bill Duckworth (footballer, born 1918) (1918–2016), Australian rules footballer